The Home Secretary (IAST: Gṛha Saciva गृह सचिव) is the administrative head of the Ministry of Home Affairs. This post is held by a senior IAS officer of the rank of Secretary to Government of India. The current Home Secretary is Ajay Kumar Bhalla.All Central Forces including the CRPF, CISF, BSF and State Police Forces are under the Union Home Secretary.

As a Secretary to Government of India, the Home Secretary ranks 23rd on Indian Order of Precedence.

Powers, responsibilities and postings 
Home Secretary is the administrative head of the Ministry of Home Affairs, and is the principal adviser to the Home Minister on all matters of policy and administration within the Home Ministry.

The role of Home Secretary is as follows:
 To act as the administrative head of the Ministry of Home Affairs. The responsibility in this regard is complete and undivided.
 To act as the chief adviser to the Home Minister on all aspects of policy and administrative affairs.
 To represent the Ministry of Home Affairs before the Public Accounts Committee of the Parliament of India.
 To act as the first among equals secretaries in the Ministry of Home Affairs.

Emolument, accommodation and perquisites 
The Home Secretary is eligible for a Diplomatic passport. The official earmarked residence of the Union Home Secretary is 3, New Moti Bagh, New Delhi, a Type-VIII bungalow.

As the Home Secretary is of the rank of Secretary to Government of India, his/her salary is equivalent to Chief Secretaries of State Governments and to Vice Chief of Army Staff/Commanders, in the rank of Lieutenant General and equivalent ranks in Indian Armed Forces.

List of Home Secretaries

See also
 Cabinet Secretary of India
 Foreign Secretary of India
 Defence Secretary of India
 Finance Secretary of India

References

Bibliography 

 
 

Civil Services of India
Indian government officials
Indian Administrative Service officers
Ministry of Home Affairs (India)